Devario acrostomus is a freshwater fish native to the Mekong River. It is currently only known from Laos.

It can reach  in total length.

References

Devario
Cyprinid fish of Asia
Fish of the Mekong Basin
Fish of Laos
Endemic fauna of Laos
Fish described in 1999
Taxa named by Maurice Kottelat
Taxa named by Fang Fang Kullander